Eucypris is a genus of ostracods belonging to the family Cyprididae.

The genus has cosmopolitan distribution.

Species:
 Eucypris accipitrina Anichini Pini, 1968 
 Eucypris anglica Fox, 1967

References

Podocopida
Podocopida genera